Tang-e Anar may refer to:
 Tang-e Anar-e Olya
 Tang-e Anar-e Sofla
 Tang-e Anar-e Vosta